= Krimsky Listok =

- Founder(s): N. V. Mikhno
- Founded: February 12, 1878; 147 years ago
- Language: Russian
- Ceased publication: April 1879

Krimsky Listok (Russian: Крымский листок, 'Crimean Leaflet') was a newspaper of public life; literary and political newspaper published in Simferopol in 1878–1879. The newspaper was published twice a week. The newspaper was closed in April 1879. The reason for the appearance of the newspaper was the Russo-Turkish war of 1877—1878, which caused an increase in the need for information in society, which caused the trend of new publications, in most cases private.

== Editors and publishers ==
- N. V. Mikhno
